The 2022 World Seniors Darts Masters (known for sponsorship reasons as the 2022 JENNINGSbet World Seniors Darts Masters) was the first World Seniors Darts Masters organised by the World Seniors Darts Tour and was held at the Lakeside Country Club in Frimley Green between 27–29 May 2022.

The event was open to players over the age of 50, and was a joint venture between MODUS Sports and Jason Francis, which organised Snooker Legends and World Seniors Championship of Snooker in 2017–18.

David Cameron became the inaugural champion after defeating Phil Taylor 6–3 in the final. Cameron's victory was even more remarkable, as he had to win a qualifier to enter this event, and if he had won his first match at the 2022 WDF World Darts Championship (incidentally held at the same venue), he wouldn't have been able to take part in the qualifier.

Format
As with the World Masters tournaments previously organised by the British Darts Organisation, the Masters will use the set format, but with each set being a best of three legs (or first to two legs). The preliminary and first rounds, as well as the quarter-finals will be the best of 7 sets, the semi-finals will be the best of 9 sets, and the final will be the best of 11 sets.

Prize money
The prize fund of £31,000 was announced in January, but that was before the tournament expanded to 20 players.

Qualifiers
On 11 January 2022, the first 6 players of the 16-player 2-day tournament were announced, which were Phil Taylor, Martin Adams, Bob Anderson, John Lowe, John Part and Les Wallace.

On 13 February, the numbers of entrants was increased to 20, and an extra day was added to tournament, with two players qualifying via qualifiers at Reading on 9–10 April, along with the highest non-qualified player on the World Series Tour Order of Merit, with the final player being decided by a fans vote on the WSDT's social media channels.

Invited players
Starting in First round
  Martin Adams (Quarter-finals)
  Bob Anderson (First round)
  Lisa Ashton (First round)
  Keith Deller (Quarter-finals)
  Trina Gulliver (First round)
  Deta Hedman (First round)
  John Lowe (First round)
  Colin Monk (Quarter-finals)
  Tony O'Shea (Semi-finals)
  Phil Taylor (Runner-up)
  Robert Thornton (First round)
  Les Wallace (Quarter-finals)

Starting in Preliminary round
  Terry Jenkins (Preliminary round)
  Kevin Painter (Preliminary round)
  John Part (First round)
  Roland Scholten (Preliminary round)

Qualifiers
Starting in Preliminary round
  David Cameron (Champion)
  Wayne Jones (First round)

Highest Non-Qualifier On WSDT Order of Merit
Starting in Preliminary round
  Richie Howson (Semi-finals)

Fans' Vote Winner
Starting in Preliminary round
  Paul Lim (Preliminary round)

Draw
The draw for the tournament was announced on 3 March 2022.

Broadcasting rights
BT Sport aired the tournament in the United Kingdom, and Sport1 broadcast it in Germany.

References

World Seniors Darts Masters
World Seniors Darts Masters
World Seniors Darts Masters